Al-hwash may refer to:

Al-Hawash, Hama, a village in Hama Governorate, Syria
Al-Hawash, Homs Governorate, a village in Homs Governorate, Syria